Norillag, Norilsk Corrective Labor Camp was a gulag labor camp set by Norilsk, Krasnoyarsk Krai, Russia and headquartered there. It existed from June 25, 1935 to August 22, 1956.

Initially, the Norillag labor force was responsible for the construction of the Norilsk mining-metallurgic complex and for mining copper and nickel. Its activities gradually expanded into virtually all economical functions of the region, from fishing to "reconstruction of the house where lived Comrade I.V. Stalin in exile".

Starting from 1,200 inmates in 1935, its numbers jumped to 9,000 in 1937 (the onset of the Great Purge) and peaked in 1951 at 72,500, housed in 30 camp sections. Memorial estimates the total number of its inmates over the history of the camp at 400,000, with about 300,000 being political prisoners. The geography of this camp system included the Norilsk area, including Dudinka and Kayerkan, as well as more remote places, including Krasnoyarsk and some agricultural camps in Kureika (village), Atamanovo and Shushenskoye.

Initially the construction activities were handled by the Norilstroy (Норильстрой), while Norillag supplied the workforce and some infrastructure.

In 1953, shortly after the death of Joseph Stalin, the Gorlag camp of Norillag system was the place of the major Gulag revolt, known as the Norilsk uprising.

It was closed in 1957, together with most of the Gulag system.

Selected notable inmates

 Aleksei Balandin
 Dmitri Bystrolyotov
Herbert Brede (1888–1942), Estonian military commander
Walter Ciszek (1904–1984), Polish-American Jesuit priest
Eufrosinia Kersnovskaya (1908–1994), writer and artist
Grigoriy Kirdetsov (1880–1938), journalist and translator
Jānis Medenis (1903–1961), Latvian poet and writer 
Isaiah Oggins (1898–1947), American communist and Soviet spy
Jacques Rossi (1909–2004), Polish-French writer and polyglot
Nikolay Urvantsev (1893–1985), geologist and explorer
Nikolai Vekšin (1887–1951), Estonian sailor
Karlo Štajner (1902-1992), Croatian writer

See also

References

Ertz, Simon Chapter 7, "Building Norilsk" In "The Economics of Forced Labor: The Soviet Gulag", Paul R. Gregory, Valery V. Lazarev (eds.). Stanford: Hoover Institution Press, 2003

External links

 Norillag: Internet Resources
 Norillag: twitter
 Norillag: facebook page
 Norillag: blogger
 Norillag: wordpress
 Norillag: livejournal
 Norillag: livejournal community

Norillag
Buildings and structures in Krasnoyarsk Krai